Bangladesh competed at the 1996 Summer Olympics in Atlanta, United States.

Athletics 

Men

Women
Field Events

Shooting

Men

Swimming

Men

References

Nations at the 1996 Summer Olympics
1996
Olympics